K115 or K-115 may refer to:

K-115 (Kansas highway), a state highway in Kansas
Bakuriani K-115, a ski jump hill
9K115 Metis, an anti-tank missile
9K115-2 Metis-M, a anti-tank missile
HMCS Lévis (K115), a former Canadian Navy ship

See also
Ripasudil, previously known as K-115